The 2015 Southern Conference women's basketball tournament was held between Thursday, March 5 and Sunday, March 8 in Asheville, North Carolina, at Kimmel Arena and the U.S. Cellular Center.  won their 16th tournament championship and earned the SoCon's automatic bid into the 2015 NCAA Women's Division I Basketball Tournament.

Bracket

References

Tournament
SoCon women's
College basketball tournaments in North Carolina
Southern Conference women's basketball tournament
Southern Conference women's basketball tournament
Southern Conference women's basketball tournament